Saif Hyder Hasan is an Indian playwright, director and producer.

Notable work

Aaine ke Sau Tukde, playwright, director, producer
Ek Mulaqat 2014 writer, director, producer
Gardish Mein Taare play writer, director, producer

References

Living people
Year of birth missing (living people)
Indian dramatists and playwrights
Indian theatre directors
Indian theatre managers and producers